Brian Thomson (born 1 September 1957 in Tokoroa) is a sport shooter from New Zealand. He competed at the 2000 Summer Olympics in the men's skeet event, in which he tied for 47th place.

References

1957 births
Living people
Skeet shooters
New Zealand male sport shooters
Shooters at the 2000 Summer Olympics
Olympic shooters of New Zealand
Commonwealth Games medallists in shooting
Commonwealth Games silver medallists for New Zealand
Shooters at the 1994 Commonwealth Games
Medallists at the 1994 Commonwealth Games